is a historian of diplomatic history, international, and transnational history. He taught at University of Chicago and Harvard University until his retirement in 2005.

In 1988 he served as president of the American Historical Association, the only Japanese citizen to do so, and also served as president of the Society for Historians of American Foreign Relations. In 2005, he was awarded the Order of the Sacred Treasure, Gold and Silver Star, one of Japan's highest civilian honors. He was also awarded Japan's Yoshida Shigeru Prize for best book in public history. He has been a member of the American Academy of Arts and Sciences since 1982.

Biography
Akira Iriye was born in Tokyo, in 1934, and graduated from Seikei High School. his father, Keishiro Iriye, was trained in law at Waseda University and published on Japan and international relations both as a scholar and journalist. He went to the United States to study at Haverford College. where Wallace MacCaffrey interested him in the study of English history. He graduated in 1957, and accepted an invitation from the Harvard History Department's American For Eastern Policy Studies. He finished his Ph.D. in history in 1961. At Harvard, he studied with John K. Fairbank and Ernest R. May. He was awarded a Guggenheim Fellowship in 1974. Iriye began as an instructor and lecturer in history at Harvard; taught at the University of California at Santa Cruz, the University of Rochester, and the University of Chicago; and accepted an appointment as professor of history at Harvard University in 1989, where he became Charles Warren Professor of American History in 1991. He was director of the Edwin O. Reischauer Institute of Japanese Studies from 1991 to 1995.

Since retiring in 2005, he has taught at Waseda University, Ritsumeikan University, and the University of Illinois as a guest professor.

Career and scholarship
The focus of his research and thinking first turned to the United States, China, and Japan's interactions in the period leading up to the Pacific War, a war which he experienced first hand as a child. His first book, After Imperialism: The Search for a New Order in the Far East, 1921–1931, based on his PhD thesis, made use of the multi-archival and multi-lingual research which characterizes his scholarship. The book presents the argument that the collapse of the "diplomacy of imperialism" after Treaty of Versailles left a vacuum in the East Asian international system, a theme also explored in his 1972 Pacific Estrangement: Japanese and American Expansion, 1897–1911. But his 1981 Power and Culture: the Japanese-American War, 1941–1945 explained in more optimistic terms the almost instantaneous transition in 1945 from racial all-out war to alliance in terms of underlying cultural parallels between the two countries.

As a graduate student, Iriye had been supported by the Committee on American-East Asian Relations, and then joined the new generation of scholars in the field, along with James C. Thomson, Jr. and Warren Cohen. Along with Cohen, he worked to establish the Journal of American-East Asian Relations.

Across the Pacific: An Inner History of American-East Asian Relations, first published in 1965, surveys nearly two centuries of interaction, but is more than a synthesis of scholarship in the field; it looks at how the thinking elites and policymakers in the three countries interacted, a theme explored in the conference volume Mutual Images: Essays in American-Japanese Relations (1975).
This approach used but moved beyond traditional diplomatic history by incorporating cultural perspectives, shown also in his work on the Cold War, including The Cold War in Asia, (1974) and the co-edited conference volumes The Origins of the Cold War in Asia (1977) and The Great Powers in East Asia, 1953–1960 (1990).

However, the focus of his thought was moving in new directions and beyond East Asia. In his presidential address to the American Historical Association in 1988, "The Internationalization of History," Iriye pointed out that "at one level, this will necessitate the establishment of closer ties between the American and overseas historical communities. At another level, the effort will entail the search for historical themes and conceptions that are meaningful across national boundaries. At still another level, each historian will have to become more conscious of how his or her scholarship may translate in other parts of the world."

In his 1997 Cultural Internationalism and World Order and the 2002 Global Community: The Role of International Organizations in the Making of the Contemporary World he looked at the growth of NGOs and global consciousness rather than diplomacy, and called for new levels of thought and analysis.

Selected works
In a statistical overview derived from writings by and about Akira Iriye, OCLC/WorldCat encompasses roughly 100+ works in 300+ publications in 5 languages and 17,000+ library holdings.

 After Imperialism: The Search for a New Order in the Far East, 1921–1931 (Cambridge: Harvard University Press, 1965). Reprinted: (Chicago: Imprint Publications, 1990).
 Across the Pacific: An Inner History of American-East Asian Relations (Chicago: Harcourt, Brace, 1967). Reprinted: Chicago: Imprint, 1992.
 Pacific Estrangement: Japanese and American Expansion, 1897–1911 (Cambridge: Harvard University Press, 1972; reprinted (Chicago: Imprint Publications, 1994).).
 Priscilla Clapp, Akira Iriye, eds., Mutual Images: Essays in American-Japanese Relations (Cambridge: Harvard University Press, 1975).
 Yonosuke Nagai, Akira Iriye, eds., The Origins of the Cold War in Asia (New York: Columbia University Press, 1977).
 Power and Culture: The Japanese-American War, 1941–1945 (Cambridge: Harvard University Press, 1981).
 Nobutoshi Hachara, Akira Iriye, Georges Nival, and Philip Windsor (eds.). Experiencing the Twentieth Century (Tokyo: University of Tokyo Press, 1985).
 The Origins of the Second World War in Asia and the Pacific (London; New York: Longman, 1987).
 
 Akira Iriye, Warren I. Cohen, eds., The United States and Japan in the Postwar World (Lexington: University Press of Kentucky, 1989).
 Warren I. Cohen, Akira Iriye, eds., The Great Powers in East Asia, 1953–1960  (New York: Columbia University Press, 1990).
Fifty Years of Japanese-American Relations (in Japanese, 1991)
 Akira Iriye, Michael J. Barnhart, eds., "Above the Mushroom Clouds: Fiftieth Anniversary Perspectives," Journal of American-East Asian Relations 4.2 (Summer 1995): 89–179.
The Globalizing of America (1993)
Cultural Internationalism and World Order (1997).
Global Community: The Role of International Organizations in the Making of the Contemporary World (2002)
Holt World History: The Human Journey (200).
 Akira Iriye,China and Japan in the Global Setting (Cambridge, MA: Harvard University Press, 1992; pbk 1998).  The 1989 Edwin O. Reischauer Lectures
 The Human Rights Revolution, co-edited with Petra Goedde and William Hitchcock (New York: Oxford University Press, 2012)

References and further reading

See also
Kodansha Encyclopedia of Japan
American Historical Association
Jinan incident
List of Guggenheim Fellowships awarded in 1974

Notes

External links
"Akira Iriye," Interview, Japan and World War II, 

1934 births
Living people
20th-century American historians
20th-century American male writers
Historians of Asia
People from Tokyo
Haverford College alumni
Harvard University alumni
Academic staff of Kansai University
Miller Center Affiliates
American academics of Japanese descent
Presidents of the American Historical Association
Japanese emigrants to the United States
Historians of Japan
Historians of American foreign relations
Recipients of the Order of the Sacred Treasure, 2nd class
American Academy of Arts and Sciences
American male non-fiction writers